Sandy Gumulya (born 2 April 1986) is an Indonesian former tennis player and the older sister of Beatrice Gumulya, also a professional tennis player.

Career
Sandy made her debut as a professional in July 2000, aged 14, at an ITF tournament in Jakarta. In March 2009, she was the highest ranked Indonesian in the WTA rankings (singles).

In 2002 and 2003, she played in the Australian Open junior championships. In 2003, she and her partner Septi Mende reached the quarterfinals of the junior doubles competition at the Australian Open.

She was part of Indonesia Fed Cup team in 2003, 2004, 2008 and 2009.

Gumulya represented Indonesia at the 2006 Asian Games at Doha. She won her first-round match, and was then defeated by Li Na in the second round.

At the 2007 Southeast Asian Games, Gumulya won the gold medal in the women's single competitions, and also won the silver medal in the women's doubles competition with Romana Tedjakusuma as partner. Gumulya also enjoyed success at the 2009 Southeast Asian Games, winning bronze in the women's doubles and a silver in the women's team event.

In March 2009, Gumulya retired during the second set of the quarterfinal of the ASB Pro tournament at Hamilton, New Zealand, due to a knee injury. The injury forced her to withdraw from the third and final tournament of the ASB Pro Circuit, that at Wellington.

ITF Circuit finals

Singles (11–6)

Doubles (3–8)

External links
 
 
 

Indonesian female tennis players
1986 births
Living people
Sportspeople from Jakarta
Tennis players at the 2006 Asian Games
Universiade medalists in tennis
Southeast Asian Games gold medalists for Indonesia
Southeast Asian Games silver medalists for Indonesia
Southeast Asian Games bronze medalists for Indonesia
Southeast Asian Games medalists in tennis
Competitors at the 2007 Southeast Asian Games
Competitors at the 2009 Southeast Asian Games
Universiade bronze medalists for Indonesia
Asian Games competitors for Indonesia
Medalists at the 2007 Summer Universiade
21st-century Indonesian women